14 Henrietta Street is a museum located on Henrietta Street in Dublin, Ireland. The museum, sometimes referred to as the Tenement Museum, opened in September 2018.

History
Construction of Henrietta Street began in the 1720s, on land bought by Luke Gardiner. Numbers 13, 14 and 15 were built in the late 1740s by Gardiner as a speculative enterprise. Number 14's first occupant was Lord Richard Molesworth and his second wife Mary Jenney Usher. Other notable residents in the late 18th century included Lord John Bowes, Sir Lucius O'Brien, Sir John Hotham, and Viscount Charles Dillon.

After the Act of Union in 1800, Dublin entered a period of economic decline. 14 Henrietta Street was occupied by lawyers, courts and a barracks during the 19th century. By 1877, a landlord called Thomas Vance had removed its grand staircase and divided it into 19 tenement flats of one, three and four rooms. An advert in The Irish Times from 1877 read: "To be let to respectable families in a large house, Northside, recently papered, painted and filled up with every modern sanitary improvement, gas and wc on landings, Vartry Water, drying yard and a range with oven for each tenant; a large coachhouse, or workshop with apartments, to be let at the rere. Apply to the caretaker, 14 Henrietta St." By 1911, it was home to over 100 people. The last families left the house in 1979.

Restoration work began in 2006 and took over ten years to complete. 14 Henrietta Street is owned and was restored by Dublin City Council, but is operated by the Dublin City Council Culture Company. The house has been restored to show the original Georgian period through to its final incarnation as a tenement.

Gallery

References

External links
 

2018 establishments in Ireland
Georgian architecture in Ireland
Museums established in 2018
Museums in Dublin (city)
History museums in the Republic of Ireland
Houses completed in 1749
Historic house museums in the Republic of Ireland